is a passenger railway station in the city of Isesaki, Gunma, Japan, operated by the private railway operator Tōbu Railway.

Lines

Station layout
Shin-Isesaki Station has two elevated side platforms, with the station building underneath.

Platforms

Adjacent stations

History
The station opened on 27 March 1910.

From 17 March 2012, station numbering was introduced on all Tōbu lines, with Shin-Isesaki Station becoming "TI-24".

New elevated platforms and a new station building were brought into use from 19 October 2013.

Surrounding area
Isesaki City Hall
Isesaki Chuo Post Office

Passenger statistics
In fiscal 2019, the station was used by an average of 1310 passengers daily (boarding passengers only).

See also
 List of railway stations in Japan

References

External links

  

Railway stations in Gunma Prefecture
Stations of Tobu Railway
Tobu Isesaki Line
Railway stations in Japan opened in 1910
Isesaki, Gunma